Salt Sugar Fat: How the Food Giants Hooked Us is a book by Michael Moss published by Random House in 2013 that won the James Beard Foundation Award for Writing and Literature in 2014. It also was a number one New York Times bestseller in 2013. In his book, Moss cites examples from Kraft, Coca-Cola, Lunchables, Frito-Lay, Nestlé, Oreos, Capri Sun, and many more, where scientists calculate the combination of sugar, fat and salt ("bliss point") for convenience food that is guaranteed to have an optimal appeal for the customer.
The "conditioned hypereating" discussed in this book was also mentioned in a 2009 book by former FDA director David A. Kessler.

References

Further reading
 
 
 

2013 non-fiction books
Books by Michael Moss
Popular science books
Random House books